Reckendorf is a community in the district of Bamberg, in Upper Franconia, Bavaria, Germany. With roughly 2,000 inhabitants, Reckendorf is a member of the administrative community (Verwaltungsgemeinschaft) of Baunach.

Geography
Reckendorf lies in the Upper Franconia-Northwest region.

Constituent communities
Reckendorf's main and namesake centre is by far the biggest of its Gemeindeteile with a population of 1,952. The community furthermore has these outlying centres, each given here with its own population figure:
Laimbach 54
Obermanndorf 28
Untermanndorf 17
Zeitzenhof 5

The community also has four traditional rural land units, known in German as Gemarkungen, named Laimbach, Reckendorf, Daschendorfer Forst and Lußberger Forst, two of which have the same names as two of the constituent communities (it is traditional for a Gemarkung to be named after a town or village lying nearby). The other two are woodlands.

History
The Lords of Schöfstall were from 1349 until the time when they died out in 1544 the local landowners and the local castle’s keepers. The later knightly estate belonging to the Barons of Wiesenthau passed with Bavaria's mediatization at the time of the border adjustments in 1810 to the Grand Duchy of Würzburg, ruled by Ferdinand III, Grand Duke of Tuscany, with which it eventually passed back to Bavaria in 1814. 

In the course of administrative reform in Bavaria, today’s community came into being under the Gemeindeedikt (“Community Edict”) of 1818.

Population development
Within municipal limits, 1,526 inhabitants were counted in 1970, 1,546 in 1987 and 1,800 in 2000. Currently it is 2,036.

Politics
The mayor is Manfred Deinlein (SPD), first elected in 2014 and re-elected in 2020.

The community council is made up of 12 members, listed here by party or voter community affiliation, and also with the number of seats that each holds:
 CSU 7
 WBFW 5

In 1999, municipal tax revenue, converted to euros, amounted to €623,000 of which business taxes (net) amounted to €23,000.

Economy and infrastructure
According to official statistics, there were 134 workers on the social welfare contribution rolls working in producing businesses, and in trade and transport 16. In other areas, 43 workers on the social welfare contribution rolls were employed, and 656 such workers worked from home. In processing businesses there were no businesses, and in construction 2. Furthermore, in 1999, there were 25 agricultural operations with a working area of 372 ha, of which 287 ha was cropland and 85 ha was meadowland.

Transport connections
Road: Bundesstraße 279
Rail: Regional railway trains running towards Bamberg and Ebern

Education
In 1999, the following institutions existed in Reckendorf:
75 kindergarten places with 73 children
Primary school belonging to the Gesamtschule Baunach

Breweries
Formerly, Reckendorf had one big brewery and five smaller ones. There are now still two breweries:
Brauerei Schroll
Schlossbrauerei Reckendorf

Reckendorf's brewery history
Brauerei Johann Goldschmitt until 1870, Brauerei Georg Zeck until 1925, Brauerei Zeckbräu Josef Stolbinger until 1960
Brauerei Michael Grasser 1905–1910
Brauerei zum Hirschen Franz Mötzinger until 1870, Hirschbräu Hans Lechner until 1964
Schlossbrauerei until 1870, Schlossbrauerei Georg Dirauf until 1952, Schlossbrauerei Georg Dirauf until 1973, Schlossbrauerei Georg Dirauf KG
Brauerei Friedrich Sippel until 1870, Brauerei Andreas Sippel until 1948
Brauerei Pankraz Voll until 1870, Brauerei Rudolf Schmitt until 1965, Brauerei Rudolf Schroll

Culture and sightseeing
St. Nikolaus Catholic parish church
The old Jewish cemetery lies a short way outside Reckendorf.
Former Reckendorf synagogue, since converted into the Haus der Kultur ("House of Culture"). An exhibit about this synagogue and the Jews in Reckendorf up until the Second World War can be viewed on the women’s gallery.

Regular events
Every ten years, the Altweibermühle ("Old Wives' Mill") takes place. This is a Shrovetide (Fasching) procession with roughly a hundred years of tradition behind it.

Clubs and associations
In Reckendorf there are many of these:
 Sport clubs
ASV Reckendorf
Tennisclub Reckendorf 1981 e. V.
Tisch-Tennis-Club (table tennis)
 Political associations
Bayernpartei OV Reckendorf (local association)
CSU-Ortsverband Reckendorf (local association)
Frauenunion CSU OV Reckendorf (local women’s association)
 SPD-Ortsverein Reckendorf (local association)
 Singing and musical clubs
Männergesangverein Liederhort (men's singing club)
Gesangverein Sängerlust (singing club)
Reckendorfer Musikanten (musicians)
 Social, charitable and not-for-profit institutions
BRK Reckendorf (Bavarian Red Cross)
Caritas-Kindergartenverein St. Nikolaus e. V. (kindergarten association)
Verein für ambulante Krankenpflege (nursing)
Sozialverband VdK OV Reckendorf
Seniorenkreis Reckendorf (senior citizens' circle)
Freiwillige Feuerwehr Reckendorf (volunteer fire brigade)
Feuerwehrverein Reckendorf (fire brigade club)
Freiwillige Feuerwehr Laimbach (volunteer fire brigade)
Orgelbauverein St. Nikolaus e. V. (organ building)
VHS Außenstelle Reckendorf (folk high school)
K.A.B. Kath. Arbeitnehmer-Bewegung (Catholic employees' movement)
 Church institutions
Pfarrgemeinderat St. Nikolaus (parish council)
Pfarrjugend Reckendorf (parish youth)
 Regulars' tables and fan clubs
FCN-Fan-Club Rosl
FC Bayern Munich-Fan-Club
Stammtisch Eisbären ("regulars' table")
Stammtisch Abseits ("regulars' table")
 Other clubs
Laienspielgruppe Reckendorf (amateur play group)
Kleintierzuchtverein Reckendorf e. V. (small animal raising)
Reservistenkameradschaft (reservists)
Kameraden- und Soldatenvereinigung (comrades and soldiers)
Gartenfreunde Reckendorf e. V. (gardening)
Imkerverein Reckendorf u. U. (beekeeping)
Haßbergverein Reckendorf
 Umbrella group
Ortskulturring Reckendorf ("local culture ring"), founded in 1970

Leisure
In one's free time, the many hiking and cycling trails can be used. The Veitenstein, about 8 km away, which has a lovely view over the valley, can be visited.

References

External links

 Community’s website

Bamberg (district)